Luis Antonio Robles Suárez (24 October 1849 – 22 September 1899) also known as "El Negro Robles", was a Colombian lawyer and politician. He was the first Afro-Colombian to hold a cabinet-level ministry in Colombia serving as Secretary of the Treasury and Public Credit during the administration of President Aquileo Parra Gómez, as well as being the first Afro-Colombian Congressperson as Member of the Chamber of Representatives for Magdalena, and the first Afro-Colombian Governor of a Department, as the 16th President of the Sovereign State of Magdalena. He graduated a lawyer from Our Lady of the Rosary University in 1872, thus also becoming the first Afro-Colombian to ever serve as a lawyer in Colombia.

Career

Personal life
Born on 24 October 1849 in the hamlet of Camarones in the Municipality of Riohacha, then part of the Riohacha Province, in the Department of Magdalena, New Granada; his parents were Luis Antonio Robles and Manuela Súarez, both black freedpersons of moderate means.

He died on 22 September 1899 of cystitis infection in his longtime residence le Maison Doré in Bogotá at the age of 49, not having married and with no descendants still recovering from the death of his mother earlier that year. His childhood home in Camarones was designated a national monument, and his remains, which had been interred at the Central Cemetery of Bogotá, were transported to be interred at his childhood home which operates as a Cultural House, Library and Training Center.

See also
 Paula Marcela Moreno Zapata

References

Further reading

External links
 

1849 births
1899 deaths
People from La Guajira Department
Del Rosario University alumni
Academic staff of the Free University of Colombia
19th-century Colombian lawyers
Colombian Liberal Party politicians
Members of the Chamber of Representatives of Colombia
Members of the Senate of Colombia
Colombian Secretaries of Treasury and Public Credit
Colombian people of African descent